Ravensworth Castle may refer to:
Ravensworth Castle (North Yorkshire), in the village of Ravensworth
Ravensworth Castle (Tyne and Wear), in the civil parish of Lamesley